Mudivarthi is a village in the Nellore District of Andhra Pradesh, on the east coast of India.

Villages in Nellore district